The Foreign Correspondents' Club of Japan (FCCJ) was started in 1945 to provide infrastructure for foreign journalists working in Post-World War II Japan. Historically, the club has been located in the area around Ginza.

Today, the club offers a workroom facility, a library, a restaurant, a bar, and a steady stream of local and international speakers and panels, for its members. Its facilities are housed on the 19th and 20th floors of the Yurakucho Denki North Building in Yūrakuchō.

FCCJ publishes the monthly No. 1 Shimbun.

Presidents
Past presidents include legendary war correspondent John Rich, leading "China watcher" John Roderick, later editor of the Chicago Sun-Times Frank Devine, 1951 Pulitzer Prize winner Max Desfor, and Burton Crane, also well known as a singer for Columbia Records, singing Japanese-language versions of popular Westerns songs of the day, becoming known as the "Bing Crosby of Japan".

Membership
Club membership is around 2,000, with over 300 foreign correspondents (and their Japanese counterparts) as well as over 200 professional associates, mostly working for local media. Associate members number around 1,500 and include entrepreneurs, business executives, other professionals as well as authors and artists.

Association
The FCCJ is not a member of the International Association of Press Clubs but has reciprocal agreements with a number of Foreign Correspondents' Clubs in Asia and North America:
Foreign Correspondents' Club of Beijing
Foreign Correspondents' Club, Hong Kong
Seoul Foreign Correspondents’ Club
Foreign Correspondents' Club of Thailand
Singapore Press Club
Colombo Swimming Club
Hanoi Press Club
The Foreign Correspondents' Club of South Asia
Jaisal Club
Overseas Press Club of America
Omaha Press Club
International Press Club of Chicago
The National Press Club
National Press Club of Canada

See also
Japan National Press Club

References

External links

 FCCJ Home Page
 FCCJ History

Foreign correspondents' clubs
Japanese journalism organizations
Public Interest Incorporated Associations (Japan)